Zschadraß is a village and a former municipality in the Leipzig district in Saxony, Germany. Since 1 January 2011, it is part of the town Colditz.

References

External links 
 Page with information about the former municipality Zschadraß on colditz.de (German language)

Former municipalities in Saxony
Colditz